Georgiy (Yegor) Ilyich Altman born on April 22, 1975, Moscow. Not really well-known Russian and Israeli public person, media manager and an art dealer.  He has Israeli citizenship. He is a three times winner of the "Media Manager of Russia", an ex-adviser, an ex-former Deputy Director General of the management company United Media (radio station Business FM), a founder and a current President of the Group of companies the AltCommunication Group (PR agency AltComGroup and international modern art gallery Altmans Gallery). He is also the Head of the Public Council of the Russian Jewish Congress (RJC), the Vice-President of the Russian Association of Communication Agencies (RACA), member of the Academic Council of the Jewish Museum and Tolerance Center. Altman is a founder and President of the Igor Vulokh Creative Legacy Foundation. Besides, he is a producer, a collector, an author and an organizer of art projects in the field of contemporary art.

Education
Pedagogical education ("History"), core education - International Institute of Advertising ("Advertising") and management education - Stockholm School of Economics ("Strategic Business Management, Marketing")

Work in the media industry
Altman has been in media since 1991. At different times he held senior positions in different advertising and media companies. He participated in marketing strategies development: VTB 24, Vnesheconombank, Gazprombank, Renaissance Investment Management, Aton Capital, Antigrippin Maximum, TEZ-tour, Forex Club, Econika. «Our home is Russia». He also took part in creation of such successful projects as Kommersant-Weekend, portal BFM.ru, series of programs on the Silver Rain Radio and Echo of Moscow. About 25-years he was one of the founders and former president of the PR agency AltCommunication Group (until 2009 as a large Advertising Syndicate HIDALGO).

Radio Business FM
Business FM is the first business conversational radio in Russia where the global tendencies of economic development are discussed. The radio station is the first one that fulfilled the concept of Breaking News, Stream News: the news is broadcast live right after their appearance in the information agencies feed or after development occurred in the world. It is the first example of a continuous stream of news in the business media of Russia. Yegor Altman is one of the founders and former shareholder of the management company United Media (radio Business FM, portal BFM.ru, radio "98 hits"). Together with Dmitriy Solopov and Daniil Kupsin he stood at its origin. Also he participated in the launching of Business FM radio stations network in Saint Petersburg, Ufa and other cities. In 2009, he became an owner of Business FM radio station in Kaliningrad and Sovetsk. Business FM radio station was recognized as one of the most successful projects on the Russian media market. On March 5, 2015, the Russian Union of Industrialists and Entrepreneurs awarded Business FM as the best Russian media in business journalistic. Earlier in 2010, Business FM was awarded with the same Award nominated in “Best Business Media of Russia”. In 2012, Altman became a producer and a hero of the book “Hooligans in business: the story of Business FM success”. The book is the first Russian business case on the media business establishment (“Hooligans in business: the story of Business FM success”).

AltCommunication Group
AltCommunication Group was founded in 1996 by Yegor Altmans and his partners. Today AltCommunication Group includes the PR Agency AltComGroup and the international network of contemporary art galleries Altmans Gellery.

AltComGroup (AltCommunication Group) is an PR Agency that was formed by reorganization of the management structure of an Advertising Syndicate HIDALGO(TOP-30 world rating of media agencies Qualitativе Evaluation RUSSIA)in 2015. Member of the international network of Independent advertising agencies TAAN (Transworld Advertising Agency Network), which includes more than 50 agencies around the world. It is also an official representative of the Quadric International Agency in Russia and countries of the Commonwealth of Independent States. AltCommunication Group ranks 11th in the ranking of the largest holdings in terms of media purchases in 2017. Among the clients of the agency are the largest international and Russian companies. They include VTB group of companies, pharmaceutical company Pfizer, developer company Capital Group, Ministry of Health of the Russian Federation, Bank “FK Otkrytie” “Prosvescheniye” Education Holding and others.

In 2015 Egor Altman with partner founded the first Gallery in Moscow, which is focused on the most famous names prints. The gallery displays genuine art works of Marc Chagall, Salvador Dalí, Pablo Picasso, Henri Matisse, Andy Warhol, Takashi Murakami, Fernand Léger and others. In spring 2017 Egor Altman founded his Gallery in Tel Aviv. Today, the Altmans Gallery network has four galleries. The gallery maintains an active exhibition activity.

Art projects by Yegor Altman
Yegor Altman is the known producer. He initiated the idea to create a series of author's porcelain painted under designs of cultic abstractionist Igor Vulokh. Together with Altman, the Russian-Israeli artist Michail Grobman created a series of collector's plates in a second wave avant-garde style. His educational programs in art are also known.

Since the opening the gallery hosts a lot of exhibitions. The list of Altmans gallery`s exhibition organized by Altman:

“Passion. Blood. Wine. Woman”, the exhibition of Pablo Picasso’s works, combining unique works from private collections, previously inaccessible to the general public, as well as paintings from the gallery's collection, related by the theme of passion. At the exhibition there were displayed such series as Lysistrata, Vollard Suite, Toros y Toreros, Suite 347, and Karmen (autumn 2017, Moscow);

“My Life,” the exhibition of Marc Chagall’s works, dedicated to the 130th anniversary of the artist’s birth. Chagall’s graphics from the famous Tanakh series, lithographs on antique plots, works dedicated to Paris, Vitebsk and the artist’s childhood memories were on display. The exposition is based on color and black and white lithographs of the artist from the gallery’s collection, rare signed lithographs by Marc Chagall, as well as the unique signed monotype Le Bouffon from 1965, printed in a single copy (November 2017, Tel Aviv);

At the same time, at the Altmans Gallery in Moscow and at Mihail Chemiakin Center in St. Petersburg, exhibition “The History of Legends. Chemiakin and Vysotsky” was opened. The exhibition was dedicated to the creative tandem of the artist and poet and timed to coincide with the 80th anniversary of Vladimir Vysotsky’s birth. The exposition includes works from the series Le Ventre de Paris (January 2018, Moscow-St. Petersburg);

The “Mystery of Picasso” exhibition, combining the works from such series as Cocteau, Vollard Suite, Lysistrata, Toros y Toreros and one of the portraits of Jacqueline Rock, the last wife of Picasso (March 2018, Tel Aviv); 

The “Starting Point” exhibition by Joan Miró dedicated to the 125th anniversary of the artist’s birth. There were presented about 30 lithographs of the famous surrealist, which relate to the late period of the artist's work, starting from the 1960s (May 2018, Moscow);

The “Lovers” exposition of Marc Chagall. The thematic interior design was created by Julia Napolova architect, founder of P.S. Culture Bureau,. A surprise for the vernissage guests was an opportunity[8]  to get the original copy of “Prophet Daniel with Lions” (1965) lithograph by Marc Chagall as a gift(spring 2018, Moscow);

First exhibition of Yuri Norstein in Israel. The “Poet's Desk” exposition  consisted of drawings and giclee of the famous animator. It took Yuri Norshtein, maestro of the gallery, several months to create space design: drawings based on famous cartoons “Tale of Tales” and “Hedgehog in the Fog,” a gramophone with favorite characters known from childhood, as well as a decorative element on the ceiling based on “Tale of Tales.” Yuri Norshtein opened the exhibition. As part of the exhibition project, he also gave two lectures: in Givatayim and Haifa (October 2018, Tel Aviv);

The exhibition of lithographs by French artists (Henri Matisse, Edgar Degas, Pablo Picasso, Marс Chagall, Georges Braque, Jacques Villon, Kees van Dongen, Eugène-Louis Boudin, Jean Carzou). At the same time, an Israeli exhibition of Salvador Dali graphics took place at the same time: “A surreal life” – immersion in the world of love and surrealism of the great master. The exposition consisted of 30 etchings from the series Romeo and Juliet, Tristan and Iseult, Les Diners de Gala, Twelve Signs of the Zodiac, as well as single gravures (spring 2019, Moscow);

“Passion for Color,” the exposition dedicated to the 150th anniversary of the famous French artist, leader of the Fauvism movement (from French fauve - wild) Henri Matisse. The new Altmans Gallery project was the only anniversary exhibition of Henri Matisse not only in Russia, but in all of Eastern Europe. Besides, “Passion for Color” is the first mono-exhibition of the artist's lithographs in Moscow (autumn 2019, Moscow).

Igor Vulokh Creative Legacy Foundation
Yegor Altman is a producer, author of art-projects in contemporary art. He is a President of Igor Vulokh Creative Legacy Foundation, which regularly organizes exhibitions of the artist’s works together with collectors and largest museums and galleries of the world. Igor Vulokh is a stepfather of Yegor Altman, world-known artist, nonconformist of 60-s, one of the classists of contemporary art abstractions. His artistic biography counts more than 50 personal exhibitions around the world. Vulokh’s paintings are presented in the leading auctions, including Sotheby’s and MacDougall’s. The works of Vulokh are in the museums and collections in Russia and abroad. Some of them can be seen in the Tretyakov Gallery and Russian museum. 

The Vulokh Foundation (for short) was created to support and development of projects dedicated to the life and creative work of the cultic artist. In 2008, at the ART4.RU Museum there was a large-scale exhibition coincided with the 70th anniversary of the artist Igor Vulokh. The exhibition has shown more than 120 paintings and sheets of graphics. Yegor Altman was an idea initiator and exhibition organizer. In 2013, with Altman's active engagement the retrospective exhibition of classic Russian abstraction by Igor Vulokh was opened at the Moscow Museum of Modern Art. In 2015, a personal exhibition “REPATRIATION” was held in the Cultural Foundation EKATERINA. At its core were 43 works that had been returned to Russia from Germany a year earlier. The first art-repatriation was held featuring Altman and Igor Vulokh's family. 23 years later the artist's works were handed over to the Igor Vulokh Creative Legacy Foundation.

Activities in Jewish world
Yegor Altman is a member of the Academic Council of the Jewish Museum and Tolerance Center.
Also Yegor Altman is a member of Russian Jewish Congress  (RJC) – a leading secular Jewish organization of Russia and largest Jewish charitable find in the country. Founded in 1996, the RJC unifies leading art patrons, public characters, and cultural elite representatives, supports dozens of social, educational and cultural programs. Yegor Altman is the Head of the Public Council of RJC and takes active part in RJC’s events, promoting the positive image of this charitable organization.

Among the most remarkable events, organized with the active participation of Yegor Altman. For example “Week of memory” – a complex of memorial and educational events, confined to the International Holocaust Remembrance Day, which is annually organized by RJC with the support of the Government of Moscow;

Also it was a “Marshak’s readings” - a charity event in support of children of vulnerable families, a big program of RJC, which covers 18 cities and within the framework of which 883 children receive different kinds of assistance; 

Moscow Jerusalem day 2016 in the centre of Moscow. About 5000 of people participated in the event; Moscow Israel days – in honor of 25-years anniversary of Israeli-Russian diplomatic relations RJC supported a range of events in early June in Moscow, he also organized the meeting of Israeli Prime Minister Benjamin Netanyahu with the leaders of wish Jewish community in Israel; 

First Moscow International Conference on Combating Anti-Semitism– an important world-scale event, which gathered together world-class experts, which marked a creation of a new direction of work – provision of security for Jewish community in Russia and tolerant society; 

Commemoration meetings of Righteous Among the Nations – a new RJC project which unified this year two events, with the participation and support of members of RLC Social council of together with the Polish and Japanese Embassies; And other.

In December 2017, the Embassy of Israel in the Russian Federation held a reception at Altmans Gallery dedicated to the 130th birthday of Marc Chagall [10].The event was organized with the participation of the Russian Jewish Congress. The key event of the evening was the lighting of the 8th candle of Hanukkah by Pinchas Goldschmidt, Chief Rabbi of Moscow, the head of the rabbinical court in Russia, the CIS and Baltic countries, the chairman of the Conference of European Rabbis.

Charitable work
Within Marc Chagall's exhibition “My life” in spring 2016 in cooperation with Russian Jewish Congress a charitable auction of works of Marc Chagall and Russian musician Andrey Makarevich was a great success. All the money was transferred to the Jewish vulnerable families with children. Also in spring 2017, within the framework of social partnership of the Gallery, +1 project and platform “And all for one” there was an evening, which witnessed a charitable auction. All the money was transferred to the accounts of four charitable organizations: Program of charitable assistance to severely ill children “Line of Life”, Charitable Fund of art community support “Artist”, Program “Ski of dream” for ICP children rehabilitation, and Charitable Fund of Konstantin Khabensky that helps children with oncology and other severe cerebrum diseases.

Awards
Yegor Altman is a three times winner of the "Media Manager of Russia". In 2008 and 2012, the award had been given for creation of the unique format of the first business radio and dynamic development of Business FM radio station, and for the idea and producing of Russia's first book ( "Hooligans in business : the story of Business FM success") on the media business establishment. In 2016, Yeagor Altman won the “Head of the PR agency in advertising and marketing communication” award for continuous and progressive financial growth of the company on the background of advertising market stagnation. In 2012, Altaman was awarded with the diploma "The year with Kommersant" for the development of the idea of "Kommersant of a year", which first took place in the summer 2011 as part of St. Petersburg International Economic Forum. In 2010, he became one of the "Main persons of the advertising market" according to the results of the 20th anniversary version Sostav.ru. In 2007, he entered the top five CFOs media business according to PH "Kommersant".

Notes
1.	↑ Biography: Yegor Altman. // Vedomosti Person
2.	↑ Atlas of media managers: Yegor Ilyich Altman // Atlas of media.
3.	↑ Russians entered to the network of international PR agencies // RBC. Morning.-May 18, 2012

References

  Biography: Yegor Altman. 
  Atlas of media managers: Yegor Ilyich Altman.

External links

 Jerusalem post Sara Netanyahu bends her mind with psychic Uri Geller
 Calcalist Art in Suitcase : "People buy art in vacation."
 Israelhayom Picasso's mystery comes to Tel Aviv
 Haaretz The Mystery of Picasso - upcoming exhibition at Altmans Gallery
 BeinIzrail TLV Altmans Gallery presents first exhibition in Israel of drawings and installations by Yuri Borisovich Norstein and his wife Francesca Yarbusova
 Israelculture A Poet's Table” - Yuri Norstein in Israel , October 2018: exhibition opening and lectures in Tel Aviv and Haifa
 Haaretz Close Up on Dali - Salvador Dali's Graphic Exhibition
 Vitrina Dali in Tel Aviv
 Timeout.com Israel Rothschild's newest gallery opens its doors to the public June 15
 Informational Agency PRIME Local advertising agencies are small businesses that the government wants to support
 Gazeta.ru More than 40 works by Igor Vulokh returned to Russia
 Gazeta.ru. "Echo of Moscow" is going to be quieter
 Advertology Hidalgo and Ronaldo said that in life there is always a place for discovery!
 Sostav.ru.Hidalgo became partners Danes Quadric
 Lenta.ru «We are interested to work where our knowledge is in demand»
 Газета.Ru. Dorenko discharged from service
 Газета.Ru. Gabrelyanov promoted to Russian new
 Sostav.ru. Ex-CEO KelinMedia passed in HIDALGO
 Gazeta.ru. Finam negotiating for the sale of radio
 Kommersant FM. Metropolitan Municipality includes radio in English
 Slon. Book of the week
 Channel "Home". Wives oligarchs
 Sostav.ru. PRIZES "Russian Media"
 JourDom. Named the winner of the "Media Manager of Russia - 2012"
 Finparty.ru. Ex -Business FM on hooliganism "Kommersant FM" 
 Sostav.ru. Book Presentation
 Kommersant. Ears do not assume
 RBC Morning. How to become a hooligan in a business
 Sostav.ru. Hooligans of Russian media market
 Sostav.ru. Favorite Commercials
 Slon.ru. Persons
 Business. FM ... headed the board of directors drugmakers ' Antiviral '
 Kommersant.  Vladimir Putin's brother arrives in Master Bank
 Sostav.ru. Experts have chosen the main person of the advertising market
 Slon.ru. The new CEO 
 Advertology.ru. Altman&Solopov positioned "Parquet Hall"
 Snob.ru. Yegor Altman on the Snob project
 What is the strategy in advance imitative economy? 
 Adme.ru. During March - December 2007 Business FM earned 111 million rubles
 Campaign Sergei Garmash: PR- occasion or contradictory creative?
 Mr. Advertising 2011
 Beeline surprises by its creativity

Businesspeople from Moscow
1975 births
Living people
Stockholm School of Economics alumni
Mass media people from Moscow
Russian businesspeople in Israel